The East of Scotland Championships and later known as the TSB East of Scotland Tennis Championships for sponsorship reasons was a combined men's and women's grass court then later clay court combined men's and women's tennis tournament first established in 1887, and held at St Andrews, Fife, Scotland until 1903. In 1904 they moved to Edinburgh, Scotland until 1989 when they were discontinued.

History
The East of Scotland Championships were first established in 1887 and played at the St. Andrews Lawn Tennis Club, St Andrews, Fife, Scotland. The championships were initially played on grass courts till around 1903. In 1904 the championships were moved to Liberton Lawn Tennis Club, Liberton, Edinburgh which had clay courts, this would remain the championships venue until 1973 when the tennis club closed. In 1974 it was moved to Craiglockhart for the duration of its run in 1989 when it was discontinued.

The championships were sponsored by TSB Bank from 1983 to 1989, and wer known as the TSB East of Scotland Tennis Championships.

Event name
 East of Scotland Championships (1887-1969)
 East of Scotland Open Tennis Championships (1970-1982)
 TSB East of Scotland Tennis Championships (1983-1989)

See also
Tennis in Scotland

References

Clay court tennis tournaments
Grass court tennis tournaments
Defunct tennis tournaments in the United Kingdom